OddChild Music was an independent, London-based management company and record label founded by Marc Williams in 2011.

History
The record label title comes from its purpose: to locate and nurture young and upcoming artists. It was revealed on 5 July 2011 that OddChild made its first signing with singer Etta Bond. Writing material for her debut release, Bond worked with producer DaVinChe – having already uploaded the demo singles "Ask Me to Stay" and "Come Over". Bond also made an appearance on British rapper Wretch 32's second studio album, Black and White, on the track "Forgiveness" – which was released on 11 December 2011 as a single.

Bond and fellow OddChild signing Raf Riley released a free collaboration EP as ExR on 20 July 2012 called Emergency Room, featuring the previously unreleased demo "Ask Me To Stay" alongside 7 other tracks. The EP includes the promotional single "Boring Bitches", featuring Lady Leshurr. The video was produced by Reuben Dangoor alongside the EP artwork, and received mixed opinions due to the controversial content shown in the video.

The EP received support from many notable artists, including Labrinth, Diplo, Professor Green and Mike Skinner amongst others.  "Resolve" was released in the form of a promotional video in December 2012. Both the video and artwork were made by Dangoor.

On 26 July 2013, ExR released the music video for "Big Girl's Vogue", the first promotional single from their second EP Meds. The eight-track EP was released for free download on 8 August 2013.

On 13 October 2014, Etta Bond's third EP and debut solo EP, #CoolUrbanNewTalent, was released for free download. It features collaborations with Delilah, Raf Riley and Chris Loco. The video for Etta Bond's debut solo single '18' was released on 10 July 2015.

On 17 January 2015, the label released Ofei's Dreamers EP.

Artists
 Ashnikko
 Chris Loco
 Coldabank
 Etta Bond
 Jason Julian
 Moon Willis
 New Machine
 Raf Riley

Releases

References

Record labels established in 2011
Vanity record labels
Electronic music record labels
Dubstep record labels
Hip hop record labels
English record labels